Shenise Johnson (born December 8, 1990) is an American basketball player. Born in Rochester, New York, Johnson went to Rush–Henrietta Senior High School in Henrietta and played collegiately for the University of Miami. She was drafted by the San Antonio Stars with the fifth overall pick of the 2012 WNBA Draft.

USA Basketball

Johnson was named to the USA Women's U19 team which represented the US in the 2009 U19 World's Championship, held in Bangkok, Thailand in July and August 2009. Although the USA team lost the opening game to Spain, they went on to win their next seven games to earn a rematch against Spain in the finals, and won the game 81–71 to earn the gold medal. Johnson scored 9.4 points per game and led the team in steals, with 18.

WNBA
Johnson was selected in the first round of the 2012 WNBA Draft (fifth overall) by the San Antonio Silver Stars.

On March 12, 2015, the San Antonio Stars traded Johnson and their second round draft pick in the 2015 WNBA draft to the Indiana Fever in exchange for the Fever's first and third round draft picks in the 2015 draft.

Career statistics

College
Source

WNBA

Regular season

|-
| align="left" | 2012
| align="left" | San Antoino
| 34 || 1 || 17.1 || .364 || .412 || .854 || 3.9 || 1.4 || 0.8 || 0.2 || 1.1 || 5.6
|-
| align="left" | 2013
| align="left" | San Antoino
| 33 || 24 || 27.3 || .395 || .274 || .791 || 3.9 || 2.4 || 1.3 || 0.2 || 1.8 || 11.0
|-
| align="left" | 2014
| align="left" | San Antoino
| 30 || 1 || 17.9 || .400 || .372 || .829 || 3.3 || 1.4 || 1.0 || 0.1 || 1.1 || 6.0
|-
| align="left" | 2015
| align="left" | Indiana
| 31 || 27 || 26.2 || .467 || .413 || .805 || 4.9 || 2.4 || 1.1 || 0.2 || 1.8 || 10.9
|-
| align="left" | 2016
| align="left" | Indiana
| 29 || 10 || 22.4 || .410 || .359 || .938 || 3.5 || 2.1 || 1.2 || 0.3 || 1.7 || 9.8
|-
| align="left" | 2017
| align="left" | Indiana
| 14 || 13 || 24.9 || .433 || .333 || .950 || 3.4 || 2.5 || 1.5 || 0.3 || 1.3 || 11.3
|-
| align="left" | 2019
| align="left" | Indiana
| 17 || 0 || 12.9 || .333 || .242 || .938 || 2.1 || 1.1 || 0.7 || 0.1 || 0.7 || 4.9
|-
| align="left" | 2020
| align="left" | Minnesota
| 17 || 4 || 12.5 || .341 || .353 || .893 || 1.9 || 1.2 || 0.9 || 0.1 || 1.2 || 5.1
|-
| align="left" | Career
| align="left" | 8 years, 3 teams
| 205 || 80 || 20.8 || .403 || .348 || .861 || 3.6 || 1.8 || 1.1 || 0.2 || 1.4 || 8.2

Playoffs

|-
| align="left" | 2012
| align="left" | San Antoino
| 2 || 0 || 12.0 || .333 || .000 || .000 || 3.0 || 1.0 || 0.5 || 0.0 || 0.5 || 3.0
|-
| align="left" | 2014
| align="left" | San Antoino
| 2 || 0 || 8.5 || .125 || .000 || 1.000 || 0.5 || 1.0 || 0.0 || 0.0 || 0.5 || 2.0
|-
| align="left" | 2015
| align="left" | Indiana
| 11 || 11 || 30.5 || .500 || .286 || .933 || 4.5 || 1.5 || 0.7 || 0.5 || 1.2 || 12.4
|-
| align="left" | 2016
| align="left" | Indiana
| 1 || 0 || 22.0 || .188 || .000 || 1.000 || 4.0 || 1.0 || 1.0 || 0.0 || 2.0 || 8.0
|-
| align="left" | 2020
| align="left" | Minnesota
| 1 || 0 || 3.0 || .000 || .000 || .000 || 0.0 || 0.0 || 0.0 || 0.0 || 0.0 || 0.0
|-
| align="left" | Career
| align="left" | 5 years, 3 teams
| 17 || 11 || 23.6 || .432 || .195 || .947 || 3.6 || 1.2 || 0.6 || 0.3 || 1.0 || 9.1

References

1990 births
Living people
All-American college women's basketball players
American women's basketball players
Basketball players from New York (state)
Guards (basketball)
Indiana Fever players
McDonald's High School All-Americans
Miami Hurricanes women's basketball players
Minnesota Lynx players
Parade High School All-Americans (girls' basketball)
People from Henrietta, New York
San Antonio Silver Stars draft picks
San Antonio Stars players
Sportspeople from Rochester, New York